The Judicial Conduct Investigations Office (JCIO) is an independent statutory office in England whose remit is to investigate allegations of Judicial misconduct. Their offices are located in the Royal Courts of Justice, London. Their role is to support the Lord Chancellor and Lord Chief Justice who share responsibility for judicial discipline in England and Wales. It was established on 1 October 2013 when it replaced the Office for Judicial Complaints. The equivalent in Scotland is the Judicial Complaints Reviewer. The body was created under the Constitutional Reform Act 2005.

The JCIO publishes "disciplinary statements" when they issue a disciplinary sanction to a judicial office holder upon finding of misconduct. Such statements are deleted  after one year for sanctions below removal from office, after five years when the sanction is removal from office. However the Lord Chancellor and Lord Chief Justice may, at their discretion, decline to publish a disciplinary statement.

References

External links
 Official website

Judicial misconduct
Judiciary of England and Wales
Complaints organizations
2013 in British law
Legal regulators of the United Kingdom